Jean-François Toby (29 January 1900 – 28 June 1964) was a French colonial administrator who served as Governor of Niger, Ivory Coast and French Polynesia during the 1940s and 1950s.

Biography
Toby was born in Saint-Pierre-Quilbignon (now part of Brest) in 1900. He attended the École nationale de la France d'Outre-Mer and later joined the colonial service in Africa. He was appointed Governor of Niger in 1942. In 1943 he was  also briefly appointed Governor of Ivory Coast. He remained Governor of Niger until 1954, when he was appointed Governor of French Polynesia. He was succeeded by Pierre Sicaud in 1958.

Toby died in Plougonvelin in France in 1964 at the age of 64.

References

1900 births
People from Brest, France
Colonial Governors of French Niger
Colonial heads of Ivory Coast
Governors of French Polynesia
1964 deaths